De Witt Township is a township in Carroll County, in the U.S. state of Missouri.

De Witt Township was established in 1872, and named after De Witt, Missouri.

References

Townships in Missouri
Townships in Carroll County, Missouri